Donnellsmithia is a genus of flowering plants belonging to the family Apiaceae.

Its native range is Mexico to western Venezuela. It is found in the countries of Colombia, Costa Rica, El Salvador, Guatemala, Honduras, Mexico, Nicaragua, Panamá and Venezuela.

The genus name of Donnellsmithia is in honour of John Donnell Smith (1829–1928), an American biologist and taxonomist, it was published in Bot. Gaz. Vol.15 on page 15 in 1890.

Known species:

Donnellsmithia ampulliformis 
Donnellsmithia biennis 
Donnellsmithia breedlovei 
Donnellsmithia coahuilensis 
Donnellsmithia cordata 
Donnellsmithia dissecta 
Donnellsmithia guatemalensis 
Donnellsmithia hintonii 
Donnellsmithia juncea 
Donnellsmithia madrensis 
Donnellsmithia mexicana 
Donnellsmithia ovata 
Donnellsmithia pinnatisecta 
Donnellsmithia reticulata 
Donnellsmithia serrata 
Donnellsmithia silvicola 
Donnellsmithia submontana 
Donnellsmithia ternata 
Donnellsmithia tuberosa

References

Apioideae
Plants described in 1890
Flora of Central America
Flora of Mexico